Gródek  is a village in the administrative district of Gmina Drzycim, within Świecie County, Kuyavian-Pomeranian Voivodeship, in north-central Poland.

The village has a population of 1,200.  The river Wda, with a hydroelectric plant, runs through the town.

References

Villages in Świecie County